Chukwudumeme Onwuamadike, popularly known as Evans, is a convicted Nigerian  kidnapper. Onwuamadike is a native of Nnewi, Anambra State. He is sometimes referred to as "The Billionaire Kidnapper" because the Nigeria Police Force (NPF) believe he is one of the richest criminals in the kidnapping activities in Nigeria. In some of his operations, he made amounts of up to 1 million dollars. The Inspector General of Police Special Intelligence Response Team (IRT) of the Nigeria police force also described as a very smart, crafty, and intelligent kidnapper having evaded arrest for four years even though he was on a most wanted list in three states (Lagos State, Edo State, and Anambra State).

Onuamadike was arrested in Lagos during the weekend of 10–11 June 2017.

Trial
Onuamadike is undergoing trial on 52 charges of multiple murders, armed robberies, kidnappings, unlawful possession of firearms, unlawful possession of ammunition, conspiracy, among other charges. Specifically, he is being charged of unlawful capture of Uche Okereafor in Festac area of Lagos State on 21 November 2017 and demand a ransom of $2million. According to the Director of Public Prosecutions, Ms. Titilayo Shitta-Bey, Onuamadike contravened sections 409 and 269 of the Criminal Laws of Lagos State 2011. As of March 2021, his trial was still pending.

Conviction
On Friday, February 25, 2022, the Lagos state high court found Evans and two others guilty of kidnapping and conspiracy. In the ruling, the trial judge claimed "He showed no remorse in the dock and tried to lie his way out of the crimes despite the video evidence". Evans was thereafter sentenced to life imprisonment.

References

External links

The Guardian (Nigeria) coverage

Living people
Nigerian kidnappers
Year of birth missing (living people)